SS Karagola was a  cargo and passenger liner built in 1887 by A. & J. Inglis of Pointhouse, Glasgow for the British India Steam Navigation Company. Inglis also built her three-cylinder triple expansion steam engine, which developed 1,797 ihp. She was destroyed by fire at Akyab on 20 April 1901 and subsequently scrapped.

References

1887 ships
Ships built on the River Clyde
Ships of the British India Steam Navigation Company